Jean Michel Alexandre Boucicaut (born 18 November 1981), known as Alexandre Boucicaut, is a Haitian former footballer who played as a midfielder for the Haiti national team.

Club career
Boucicaut played 47 games from 2000 to 2004 for Violette AC in the Haitian First Division, scoring 22 goals during his four years with the popular Haitian side. Played with Racing Club Haïtien of the Haitian First Division during the 1999 and 2000 seasons.

Boucicaut became the fourth player from Haiti to play in Major League Soccer, following on the heels of retired Los Angeles Galaxy midfielder Sébastien Vorbe, Patrick Tardieu, and Jean Philippe Peguero.

Boucicaut won the 2013 Dominican Republic First Division league championship and was selected Most Valuable Player playing with Don Bosco Moca.

International career
Boucicaut played 15 games for the Haiti under-23 national team and eight games for the senior national team. He has scored 12 international goals in his 23 combined appearances with the Haitian U23 and senior national teams.

Boucicaut scored Haiti's lone goal in the 67th minute of the team's 1–1 draw with the United States in an international friendly in 2004 at the Orange Bowl in Miami. He was named to Haiti's 2002 CONCACAF Gold Cup squad at the age of 20. He made his debut for the Haitian senior team in 2002 in a match against Honduras. He played 15 games for the Haitian U23, including three games during CONCACAF qualifying for the 2004 Olympics. He also was a Haiti squad member at the 2002 and 2007 Gold Cup Finals

References

External links
 Quererato roster 2007/2008 - ESPN

1981 births
Living people
Sportspeople from Port-au-Prince
Haitian footballers
Association football midfielders
Haiti international footballers
2007 CONCACAF Gold Cup players
Violette AC players
Chicago Fire FC players
Colorado Rapids players
Independiente Santa Fe footballers
Querétaro F.C. footballers
Moca FC players
San Cristóbal FC players
Ligue Haïtienne players
Major League Soccer players
Liga Dominicana de Fútbol players
Haitian expatriate footballers
Haitian expatriate sportspeople in the United States
Expatriate soccer players in the United States
Haitian expatriate sportspeople in Colombia
Expatriate footballers in Colombia
Haitian expatriate sportspeople in Mexico
Expatriate footballers in Mexico
Haitian expatriate sportspeople in the Dominican Republic
Expatriate footballers in the Dominican Republic